Aurora Innovation, Inc., doing business as Aurora, is a self-driving vehicle technology company based in Pittsburgh, Pennsylvania. Aurora has developed the Aurora Driver, a computer system that can be integrated into cars for autonomous driving. Aurora was co-founded by Chris Urmson, the former chief technology officer of Google/Alphabet Inc.'s self-driving team, which became known as Waymo, as well as by Sterling Anderson, former head of Tesla Autopilot, and Drew Bagnell, former head of Uber's autonomy and perception team.

Aurora tests its vehicles in the San Francisco Bay Area, Pittsburgh, and Dallas. In addition to its headquarters in Pittsburgh and Mountain View, the company also has offices in San Francisco, Bozeman, Montana, and Texas.

History
Aurora was founded in 2017 by Chris Urmson, the former chief technology officer of Google/Alphabet Inc.'s self-driving team, which became known as Waymo. Previously, Urmson was a member of Carnegie Mellon's Red Team, which competed in DARPA's Grand Challenges for autonomous vehicles. His two co-founders are Sterling Anderson, former head of Tesla Autopilot, and Drew Bagnell, former head of Uber's autonomy and perception team.

In January 2018, Aurora signed deals with Volkswagen and Hyundai to develop self-driving software for commercial vehicles. Also in January 2018, at CES 2018, Nvidia partnered with Aurora to provide hardware for Aurora's self-driving systems.

In October 2018, Aurora became the first self-driving vehicle company authorized to test its vehicles in Pennsylvania.

In January 2019, the company raised financing at a $2 billion valuation.

In May 2019, Aurora acquired Blackmore, a Bozeman, Montana-based company focusing on Frequency Modulated Continuous Wave (FMCW) lidar. In June 2019, Aurora announced a partnership with Fiat Chrysler Automobiles to develop self-driving technology in commercial vans. As a result of this partnership, the company was able to acquire Chrysler Pacifica minivans for its fleet of test vehicles. In June 2019, Volkswagen also announced they would be ending their partnership with Aurora.

Aurora expanded its operations to Texas in June 2020, bringing a fleet of test vehicles into the Dallas-Fort Worth area. In July 2020, Aurora debuted its own long-range lidar system called “FirstLight.”

In September 2020, the company moved its headquarters to the Strip District.

In December 2020, Aurora acquired Advanced Technologies Group (ATG), Uber's self-driving unit. Uber CEO Dara Khosrowshahi subsequently joined Aurora's board of directors. Uber also invested $400 million in Aurora and took a 26% ownership stake in the company.

In January 2021, Aurora partnered with PACCAR to develop its first commercial product, a driverless truck. Their technology will be paired with PACCAR's Peterbilt 579 and Kenworth T680 semi-trucks.

In February 2021, Aurora partnered with Toyota and Denso to develop self-driving taxis.

In March 2021, Aurora acquired 5D lidar company OURS Technology, a silicon photonics startup. Also in March, Aurora announced it was partnering with Volvo Group to develop driverless trucks. Of the three largest truck manufacturers, Aurora has partnered with two; the third, Daimler AG, had previously announced it was partnering with Waymo for self-driving technology.

In November 2021, the company became a public company via a merger with Reinvent Technology Partners Y, a special-purpose acquisition company set up by Reid Hoffman and Mark Pincus which provided $2 billion in additional funding.

In March 2022, Aurora unveiled its test fleet of autonomous Toyota Sienna robotaxi. Following this, In May 2022, Aurora announced the development of the Aurora Beacon platform. The platform is a cloud-based mission control system designed for customers to optimise operations of autonomous vehicles via real time metrics such as status, location, and health of vehicles.

In May 2022, Aurora announced the expansion of the organisations self-driving freight pilot with FedEx. The expansion is to include service from Fort Worth to El Paso, Texas. The new route challenged the company for its longest freight truck journey of about 600 miles, in which they will operate on a weekly basis. As of May, Aurora and FedEx have completed a total of 60,000 miles with zero safety incidents, according to the company.

Products
The company developed the Aurora Driver, a system that consists of sensors, software, and hardware. It can be installed in passenger or commercial automobiles, converting them into self-driving vehicles. The Aurora Driver's software uses data from its sensors to devise a safe path through a given route, while its computer powers these components and integrates them with the vehicle. The system's sensors use Aurora's FirstLight lidar, which was developed from Blackmore's FMCW lidar technology. The first vehicle to be outfitted with the Aurora Driver was the Toyota Sienna.

Conventional lidar uses pulses of light to acquire information about objects surrounding the sensor, including distance and velocity. In contrast, FMCW lidar uses a low-powered continuous beam of light, enabling faster acquisition of distance, velocity, and acceleration of surrounding objects, but often requires bulky mirrors and rangefinders. By acquiring OURS, Aurora hopes to reduce the size of the FMCW lidar hardware. Aurora plans to release the next generation of Aurora Driver, named "Fusion", in 2023.

See also
Argo AI

References

External links

Electric vehicles
Companies based in Mountain View, California
Companies based in Pittsburgh
Companies listed on the Nasdaq
Car manufacturers of the United States
Self-driving car companies
Special-purpose acquisition companies